The Cashin House, known as The Pier, is a former residence of the Cashin family extending out to sea in Lim Chu Kang, Singapore. The house on the pier will be restored and become a new visitor gateway to the western part of Sungei Buloh Wetland Reserve, later known as Lim Chu Kang Nature Park.

History
The Lim Chu Kang area in Singapore, was once made up of mangroves rain forests and rubber plantations belonged to Namazie and Cashin Estates. A pier was built in 1906 by Henry Cashin, an Irish merchant, for his rubber estate. Henry Cashin's grandson, Joseph Cashin, would built a house on the pier some time from 1920 to 1921, hence the name The Pier.

The Pier was also one of the sites where the Japanese Imperial Army first landed on the north-western coastline on 8 February 1942, catching the defending 22nd Brigade Australian soldiers by surprise. The battle was fought over the night between the Japanese Imperial Army and Australian soldiers, which saw some 360 Australian soldiers killed despite having inflicted heavy casualties on the Japanese soldiers.

Once Kranji and Lim Chu Kang fell during the Japanese Occupation of Singapore, the Japanese went on to erect a war shrine at the site. The house was used by Japanese Imperial Army officers as a comfort stop until 1945.

In the 1960s, before the rubber plantation owner and lawyer Howard Edmund Cashin (1920–2009) and his wife Gillian moved into the house, he had the war shrine removed and constructed the road to the house.

According to Howard Cashin in the interview, the Japanese war shrine was something that he had difficulty removing after the war as it was not easy to find workmen willing to demolish the shrine during that time, as the stone from the pedestal of the shrine had stood on was used to construct the road to the house that he wanted to add on.

The house was extended and redesigned, its interior was redesigned with a modern touch, with ceiling fans, aircon and other facilities powered by electricity. Barbeque pit and stone tables were the later additions on the landed compound near The Pier. Cashin and his family would lived at The Pier occasionally as their weekend resort until his death on 5 September 2009.

Redevelopment
The house has since vacated and its compound was acquired and fenced up by the Singapore Land Authority. According to URA Draft Master Plan 2013 and URA Master Plan 2014 regarding the Singapore's North Region, the house will be restored and become a visitor gateway to the western part of Sungei Buloh Wetland Reserve.

The 18-ha western extension of Sungei Buloh Wetland Reserve was named as the upcoming Lim Chu Kang Nature Park in 2020. Restoration work on the house and the Lim Chu Kang Nature Park were expected to start in the fourth quarter of 2020, and both are slated for completion in early 2022 which was subjected to the coronavirus pandemic.

See also
 Matilda House, the Cashin family former main residence.

References

Houses in Singapore
Protected areas of Singapore
Places in Singapore
North Region, Singapore
Lim Chu Kang
Western Water Catchment